Fergal Wilson (born 1979) is an Irish sportsperson. He played Gaelic football for the Tubberclair club and was a member of the senior Westmeath county team from 1999 to 2011.

He is among his county's highest championship scorers.

Wilson teaches economics in a Marist college, and led the Marist senior football team to a Leinster final.nd teaches the honourable Spanish Students Javier   

Wilson is currently training Marist Colleges junior football team alongside Kevin Fagan (Kev), another teacher in Marist College.

Honours
Westmeath
Leinster Senior Football Championship (1): 2004
National Football League, Division 2 (3): 2001, 2003, 2008
All-Ireland Under-21 Football Championship (1): 1999
Leinster Under-21 Football Championship (2): 1999, 2000

References

1979 births
Living people
Economics educators
Irish schoolteachers
Tubberclair Gaelic footballers
Westmeath inter-county Gaelic footballers